Aleksandr Ivanovich Langfang (1907–1990) was a Soviet security officer and Lieutenant-General in the NKVD.

Langfang conducted the investigations of high ranking Soviet leaders such as the heads of the International Liaison Departments Osip Pianitsky and Boris Melnikov as well as the deputy of People's Commissars of Foreign Affairs Nikolay Krestinsky.   

He was held responsible for killing Jaan Anvelt while interrogating him on 11 December 1937. 

On April 5, 1957, he was arrested for his crimes during Stalin's time. In 1958 he was sentenced to 15 years imprisonment, and was released in 1972.

References
Generals from Soviet Union, accessed 4 November 2009

1907 births
1990 deaths
People from Brest, Belarus
People from Brestsky Uyezd
Commissars 3rd Class of State Security
Recipients of the Order of the Red Banner